Rodoviário Piraí Futebol Clube, commonly known as Rodoviário Piraí, is a Brazilian football club based in Piraí, Rio de Janeiro state.

History
The club was founded on June 6, 1956. Rodoviário finished in the second place in the Copa do Interior in 1997, losing the competition to Duquecaxiense in the final. The club eventually closed its football department.

Stadium
Rodoviário Piraí Futebol Clube play their home games at Estádio Ênio Simões. The stadium has a maximum capacity of 5,000 people.

References

Association football clubs established in 1956
Defunct football clubs in Rio de Janeiro (state)
1956 establishments in Brazil